Vitali Boot is a German amateur boxer best known to win the bronze medal at super heavyweight at the 2001 World Amateur Boxing Championships. There he beat Poland's Grzegorz Kielsa (20:14), but lost to eventual winner Ruslan Chagaev.

Boot won the German championships seven times. He defeated world class Sebastian Köber in the final of the German championships 2002
but lost to him 12:18 in the final 2003. In 2004 he became German champion by defeating Ibrahim Altingul.

External links
2001 results

Heavyweight boxers
Living people
German male boxers
AIBA World Boxing Championships medalists
Year of birth missing (living people)